Pentele was a deme of ancient Attica, situated at the north-eastern extremity of the Athenian plain, at the marble quarries of Mount Brilessus, which was called Mount Pentelicus from this place. The fact of Pentele being a deme rests upon the authority of Stephanus of Byzantium alone, and has not yet been confirmed by inscriptions.

The site of Pentele is tentatively located near modern Penteli.

References

Populated places in ancient Attica
Former populated places in Greece
Demoi